

References

Kentucky Wildcats

Kentucky Wildcats football seasons